A Balangay, or barangay is a type of lashed-lug boat built by joining planks edge-to-edge using pins, dowels, and fiber lashings. They are found throughout the Philippines and were used largely as trading ships up until the colonial era. The oldest known balangay are the Butuan boats, which have been carbon-dated to 320 AD and were recovered from several sites in Butuan, Agusan del Norte.

Balangay were the first wooden watercraft excavated in Southeast Asia. Balangay are celebrated annually in the Balanghai Festival of Butuan.

Names

Balangay was one of the first native words the Europeans learned in the Philippines. The Venetian chronicler Antonio Pigafetta, who was with Ferdinand Magellan when setting foot in the Philippines in 1521 called the native boats balangai or balanghai. This word appears as either balangay or barangay, with the same meaning, in all the major languages of the Philippines. Early colonial Spanish dictionaries make it clear that balangay and barangay were originally pronounced "ba-la-ngay" and "ba-ra-ngay", but due to centuries of Spanish influence, the modern barangay is pronounced "ba-rang-gay" in modern Filipino (instead of precolonial ). Pigafetta's alternate spelling with an H, balanghai, later gave rise to the historically-incorrect neologism balanghay in the 1970s (with a new, slightly different pronunciation which Pigafetta did not intend).

The term was also used by the Tagalog people to refer to the smallest discrete political units, which came to be the term used for native villages under the Spanish colonial period. The name of the boat was usually Hispanicized in Spanish and American records as barangayan (plural: barangayanes) to distinguish them from the political unit.

Among the Ibanag people of Northern Luzon, balangay were known as barangay, a term sometimes extended to the crew. Large vessels were called biray or biwong.

In the Visayas and Mindanao, there are multiple names for balangay-type boats, including baloto (not to be confused with the balutu), baroto, biray, lapid, tilimbao (or tinimbao). Cargo-carrying versions of balangay with high sides and no outriggers (which necessitated the use of long oars instead of paddles) were also known as bidok, birok, or biroko (also spelled biroco) in the Visayas. The karakoa, a large Visayan warship, was also a type of balangay.

History

"Balangay" is a general term and thus applies to several different types of traditional boats in various ethnic groups in the Philippines. In common usage, it refers primarily to the balangay of the Visayas and Mindanao islands, which were primarily inter-island trading ships, cargo transports, and warships. Balangay warships, along with the larger karakoa, were regularly used for raiding (mangayaw) by Visayan warriors. It is believed that they may have been the "Pi-sho-ye" raiders described as regularly attacking Chinese settlements in the coast of Fujian in the 12th century AD.

In Tagalog regions, the balangay or barangay has the same functions as in the southern islands but differ in that it is constructed through the sewn-plank technique, rather than through dowels.

In the province of Cagayan in Northern Luzon, the balangay of the Ibanag people were predominantly used within the Cagayan River system, but were also sometimes used as coastal trade ships, reaching as far as the Ilocos Region. They were mainly used as cargo and fishing ships and differed from other balangay in being much smaller with a shallower draft.

Marina Sutil

During the 18th to 19th centuries, balangay were also often used as warships for defending coastal villages from Moro and Dutch raiders during the Moro Wars, in conjunction with watchtowers (castillo, baluarte, or bantáy) and other fortifications. The raiders were regularly attacking coastal settlements in Spanish-controlled areas and carrying off inhabitants to be sold as slaves in markets as far as Batavia and the Sultanate of Gowa. Defense fleets of balangay and vinta (known as the Marina Sutil, "Light Navy" or "Defense Navy") were first organized under Governor-General José Basco y Vargas in 1778. They were lightly armed but fast, which made them ideal for responding quickly to raider sightings and attacks.

Notable leaders of these defense squadrons include Don Pedro Estevan, a principalía of Tabaco, Albay; and Julián Bermejo, an Augustinian friar who commanded ten balangay and established an alarm system using a line of small relay forts in southern Cebu. They were responsible for several major naval victories against Moro raiders from the late 18th to the early 19th centuries. The most significant was the Battle of Tabogon Bay (modern Tabgon, Caramoan) in 1818, where the combined fleets of Estevan and Don José Blanco defeated around forty Moro warships led by Prince Nune, the son of a sultan from Mindanao. Nune escaped, but hundreds of Moro raiders died in the skirmish and around a thousand more were stranded and hunted down in the mountains of Caramoan. The 1818 victory led to increased usage of defense fleets and the reduction of Moro raids to only sporadic attacks on isolated fishermen or smaller villages until their eventual suppression in 1896.

Construction 

Balangay were basically lashed-lug plank boats put together by joining the carved out planks edge-to-edge. The prow and stern posts were also composed of V-shaped ("winged") single carved pieces of wood. The strakes were made from heartwood taken from the section in between the softer sapwood and the pith of trees. Tree species favored include doongon (Heritiera littoralis), lawaan (Shorea spp.), tugas (Vitex parviflora), and barayong (Afzelia rhomboidea), among others. The trees were traditionally cut on a moonlit night in accordance with local folk beliefs. A single tree usually produces two lengths of curving planks. Traditionally, the planks and other ship parts were shaped with straight (dalag) or curved (bintong) adzes hammered with a mallet called a pakang. The master shipwright is called a pandáy (similar to other craftsmen in Philippine cultures).

The balangay's keel is built first. Like most Austronesian ships (and in contrast to western ships), the keel is basically a dugout canoe (a bangka) made from a single log. The keel is also known as a baroto which is the origin of one of the alternative names for balangay in the Visayas. The Butuan balangay boats differ from later balangay designs in that they do not have a true keel. Instead, they have a central plank fitted with three parallel lines of thin lugs which serve as additional attachment points for lashings.

The outer shell of the hull is built first by fitting strakes on each side of the keel edge-to-edge (to a total of six or more). The shaping of these strakes into the appropriate curvature (lubag) requires a skilled pandáy. Some sections may necessitate the use of two or more planks for each strake. These are attached end-to-end using hooked scarf joints. Once the hull is assembled, it is left to season for a month or two.

After the wood is seasoned, the hull is taken apart once again and checked. It is then reassembled in a stage known as sugi ("matching"). This involves fitting the strakes back together. Once fitted, the space between the strakes is run through with a spoon-like implement called a lokob. This creates a space with an even thickness in between the two strakes. The space is then filled with fine palm fibers called baruk or barok and caulked with resin-based pastes. The dowels are also further secured by drilling holes into them through the planks with the help of marks inscribed beforehand. Counter pegs called pamuta are then hammered into these holes.

The second stage is known as os-os or us-us, which involves lashing the planks very tightly to wooden ribs (agar) with fiber or rattan ropes. The ropes are tied to holes bored diagonally into lugs (tambuko), which are rectangular or rounded protrusions on the inner surface of the planks. The tambuko occur at even distances corresponding to six dowel hole groupings. Wedges are then driven in the space between the ribs and the planks, drawing the lashings even tighter as the distance between them is increased. Thwarts are then placed across the hull which are also lashed to corresponding tambuko on each side and covered with removable decking.

The masts and outriggers (katig or kate) of the balangay boats were not preserved, which is why modern reconstructions tend to omit the latter. However, as with later balangay designs described by Spanish explorers, they are believed to possess large outriggers which would be necessary for them to carry sails without capsizing. Outriggers dramatically increased stability and sail power without significant increase in weight. Outriggers in large war balangay designs also supported paddling and fighting platforms known as the daramba and the burulan, respectively.

Similar traditional ship-building techniques are still preserved by Sama-Bajau boat makers in Sibutu Island in Tawi-Tawi.

Butuan boats

The Butuan balangay boats were the first wooden watercraft excavated in Southeast Asia. They were discovered in the late 1970s in Butuan, Agusan del Norte. A total of nine wooden boats were accidentally found by locals searching for alluvial gold on land near the Masao River. The site was in Sitio Ambangan, Barrio Libertad within an older dried-up river channel, perhaps a former tributary of the Masao River.

Three of the nine balangays discovered have been excavated by the National Museum and are currently preserved. The first balangay or Butuan Boat One, was discovered in 1976 and is now displayed in Balangay Shrine Museum in Libertad, Butuan. It was radiocarbon tested and was dated to 320 CE. Butuan Boat Two was dated to 1250 CE, and is now located at the Maritime Hall of the National Museum in Manila. Butuan Boat Five, excavated at Bancasi, Libertad in 1986, has been dated to 1215 CE and was transferred to the Butuan Regional Museum and is undergoing preservation. The six other boats, which are yet to be excavated, remain in their original waterlogged condition which is proven to be the best way to preserve the said artifacts.

As of June 2013, excavations of the find are still ongoing.

Declarations

National Cultural Treasures 
The balangays of Butuan was declared by President Corazon Aquino as National Cultural Treasures with Presidential Proclamation No. 86 on March 9, 1987, and the vicinity of excavation as archaeological reserves.

National Boat 
In November 2015, the Balangay was declared as the National Boat of the Philippines by the House Committee on Revisions of Laws. The Balangay was chosen so that the "future generations of Filipinos will recognize the invaluable contribution of their forefathers in shaping the country's maritime tradition and in passing on the values of solidarity, harmony, determination, courage and bravery.

House Bill 6366 proposes that the Balangay should be the National Boat of the Philippines.

The Balangay Voyage
In 2009, the Kaya ng Pinoy Inc. that conquered Mount Everest in 2006 announced plans to re-construct a balangay boat, with the help of Sama-Bajau (Sama Dilaya) and other tribal members who retained the lashed-lug boat-building techniques which were mostly lost in other islands. The balangay's voyage traced the routes of Filipino Ancestors during the waves of Austronesian settlement through Maritime Southeast Asia and the Pacific. The special wood for construction came from the established traditional source in southern Philippines, specifically Tawi-Tawi. The team have pinpointed Sama-Bajau master boat builders, whose predecessors actually built such boats, and used traditional tools during the construction. The balangay was constructed at Manila Bay, at the Cultural Center of the Philippines Complex.

The Balangays, named Diwata ng Lahi, Masawa Hong Butuan, and Sama Tawi-Tawi, navigated without the use of modern instruments, and only through the skills and traditional methods of the Filipino Sama people. They journeyed from Manila Bay to the southern tip of Sulu, stopping off at numerous Philippine cities along the way to promote the project. The journey around the country covered a distance of 2,108 nautical miles or 3,908 kilometers.

The second leg of the voyage (2010-2011) saw the balangay boats navigate around South East Asia - Brunei, Indonesia, Malaysia, Singapore, Cambodia, Thailand and up to the territorial waters of Vietnam before heading back to the Philippines.

The balangay was navigated by the old method used by the ancient mariners – steering by the Sun, the stars, the wind, cloud formations, wave patterns and bird migrations. Valdez and his team relied on the natural navigational instincts of the Badjao. Apart from the Badjao, Ivatan are also experts in using the boat. The organisers say that the voyage "aims to bring us back to the greatness of our ancestors and how colonialism robbed these away from us and produced the Filipino today".

In 2019, the Balangay Voyage team announced two more balangay (Lahi ng Maharlika and Sultan sin Sulu) will set sail on December 14, 2019, from Palawan to Butuan, then to Mactan to commemorate the 500th anniversary of the Battle of Mactan. The two boats will be temporarily renamed Raya Kolambu and Raya Siyagu.

Balangay Site Museum 
The Balangay Site Museum also known as "Balanghai Shrine Museum" houses the balangays excavated on 320 AD. It is located at Sitio Ambangan, Barangay Libertad, Butuan. It also displays the cultural materials such as human and animal remains, hunting goods, jewelries, coffins, pots and other items associated to the boat. The shrine was built in 1979 after Felix A. Luna, a resident of the area, donated the land.

Balanghai Festival
In Butuan, Agusan del Norte, the annual Balanghai Festival celebrates the settlement of Butuan via the balangay ships.

See also
 Avang
 Bangka (boat)
 Falua
 Garay (ship)
 Guilalo
 Karakoa
 Lancaran (ship)
 Lepa (ship)
 Paraw
 Vinta

References

Further reading 
Quintos, Paul. "Balangay." 101 Filipino Icons. Manila: Adarna House, Inc. and Bench, 2007.
Casal, Gabriel S., et al. "The Ingenious Filipino Boat." Kasaysayan Volume II: The Earliest Filipinos. Philippines: Asia Publishing Company Limited, 1998.
archaeology. (accessed on August 10, 2007). 
The Philippine Consulate General – Vancouver, British Columbia Canada.  (accessed on August 10, 2007).
The Indigenous Filipino Boat

External links
 Official website of The Balangay Voyage
 Some photos of Balangay
 

National Cultural Treasures of the Philippines
History of the Philippines (900–1565)
History of Agusan del Norte
World Heritage Tentative List for the Philippines
Outrigger canoes
Merchant sailing ship types
Indigenous ships of the Philippines
Austronesian culture
Tall ships